Rui Soares (born 5 October 1993 in Porto) is a Portuguese professional squash player. As of September 2022, he was ranked number 62 in the world, and number 1 in Portugal. He has competed in the main draw of multiple professional PSA tournaments, and has won 2, reaching a total of 5 finals.

References

1993 births
Living people
Portuguese male squash players
Sportspeople from Porto